Dayton is a city in and the county seat of Montgomery County, Ohio, United States.

Dayton may also refer to:

Places

Australia
Dayton, Western Australia

Canada
Dayton, Nova Scotia

United States
Dayton, Alabama
Dayton, California, in Butte County
Dayton, Idaho
Dayton, Henry County, Illinois
Dayton, LaSalle County, Illinois
Dayton, Indiana
Dayton, Iowa
Dayton, Kentucky
Dayton, Maine
Dayton, Maryland
Dayton, Berrien County, Michigan
Dayton, Tuscola County, Michigan or Daytona Station
Dayton, Minnesota
Dayton, Missouri
Dayton, Montana
Dayton, Nevada
Dayton, Newark, New Jersey, a neighborhood
Dayton, New Jersey 
Dayton, New York
Dayton, Oregon
Dayton, Pennsylvania
Dayton, Tennessee, site of the 1925 Scopes Trial
Dayton, Texas
Dayton, Virginia
Dayton, Washington
Dayton, Green County, Wisconsin, an unincorporated community
Dayton, Richland County, Wisconsin, a town
Dayton, Waupaca County, Wisconsin, a town
Dayton, Wyoming
Fort Dayton, built in the Mohawk Valley in 1776 by Elias Dayton

Other uses
Dayton (name), a given name and surname
Dayton (band), a funk band formed in Dayton, Ohio
Dayton (RTD), a transit station in Aurora, Colorado
USS Dayton (CL-78) or USS Monterey (CVL-26), an aircraft carrier
USS Dayton (CL-105), a light cruiser
University of Dayton, a university in Dayton, Ohio
Dayton's, a defunct Minneapolis-based department store chain
Dayton Wire Wheels, an after-market wheels manufacturer
Dayton Flyers, an athletics team

See also
2019 Dayton shooting
Dayton Agreement, or Dayton Peace Accord (ending the Bosnian War in 1995)
Dayton Mall, a mall in Miami Township, Montgomery County, Ohio
Dayton Township (disambiguation), multiple places
Daytona (disambiguation)